Within abstract algebra, the false nearest neighbor algorithm is an algorithm for estimating the embedding dimension.  The concept was proposed by Kennel et al. (1992). The main idea is to examine how the number of neighbors of a point along a signal trajectory change with increasing embedding dimension.  In too low an embedding dimension, many of the neighbors will be false, but in an appropriate embedding dimension or higher, the neighbors are real.  With increasing dimension, the false neighbors will no longer be neighbors. Therefore, by examining how the number of neighbors change as a function of dimension, an appropriate embedding can be determined.

See also
 Commutative ring
 Local ring
 Nearest neighbor
 Time series

References

Statistical algorithms
Dynamical systems
Nonlinear time series analysis